CYRS may refer to:

 Early Cyrillic alphabet (ISO 15924 script code Cyrs)
 Red Sucker Lake Airport, Manitoba, Canada (IATA code CYRS)